Khmelevoye is a rural locality in Molotychevsky Selsoviet Rural Settlement, Fatezhsky District, Kursk Oblast, Russia. Population:

Geography 
The village is located on the Gnilovodchik Brook (a right tributary of the Usozha in the basin of the Svapa), 116 km from the Russia–Ukraine border, 49 km north-west of Kursk, 13 km north-east of the district center – the town Fatezh, 6 km from the selsoviet center – Molotychi.

 Climate
Khmelevoye has a warm-summer humid continental climate (Dfb in the Köppen climate classification).

Transport 
Khmelevoye is located 11 km from the federal route  Crimea Highway as part of the European route E105, 3 km from the road of regional importance  (Verkhny Lyubazh – Ponyri), on the road of intermunicipal significance  (38K-002 – Khmelevoye), 17 km from the nearest railway station Vozy (railway line Oryol – Kursk).

The rural locality is situated 51 km from Kursk Vostochny Airport, 174 km from Belgorod International Airport and 224 km from Voronezh Peter the Great Airport.

References

Notes

Sources

Rural localities in Fatezhsky District